Pond Hockey is a 2008 American documentary film, directed by Tommy Haines, and produced by Northland Films. The film is an examination of the changing culture of pond hockey.

Synopsis
Director Tommy Haines and his Minnesota crew chronicle the changing culture of hockey through interviews with Wayne Gretzky, Neal Broten, Sidney Crosby, and local rinkrats, interwoven with the story of the first ever U.S. Pond Hockey Championships. The tournament was composed of 100 teams; the film follows two of these teams: The Federal League Allstars and Sofa King Lazy.

Critical reception
Pond Hockey showed at several North American film festivals and ultimately aired nationally on the NHL Network. The film was hailed as the "best and purest hockey movie ever" by ESPN's John Buccigross and one of Indiewire's "10 Great Sports Docs". The film was also included in the New York Times coverage of outdoor hockey's article "N.H.L. Ties Its Brand to Great Outdoors".

Notable cast
 Wayne Gretzky
 Neal Broten
 John Mayasich
 Sidney Crosby
 Marian Gaborik
 Lou Nanne
 John Buccigross
 Willard Ikola
 Phil Housley
 Jeff Sorem
 John "Bug" Blooston
 Patrick Kane
 Wendell Anderson
 Krissy Wendell
 Dave Miller
 Mark Kovacich
 Rick DiPietro
 Charles McGrath
 Jack Falla
 Jordan Leopold
 Matt Henderson
 Dan Hendrickson
 P. J. Axelsson
 Jonathan Toews

Producers

Director/Producer - Tommy Haines,
Producer - JT Haines,
Producer - Andrew Sherburne,
Producer - Nick Deutsch,
Executive Producer - Northland Films,
Executive Producer - Philip Falcone

Festivals/awards
 "Best of Fest" selection at the 2008 Minneapolis/St. Paul International Film Festival
 Official Selection of the 2008 Rhode Island International Film Festival
 Official Selection of the 2008 Free Range Film Festival
 Winner of the "Audience Award" at the 2008 Landlocked International Film Festival
 Official Selection of the 2010 Canadian Sports Film Festival

Philip Falcone
The executive producer, Philip Falcone, was a college hockey stand out and graduate from Harvard University, and is currently a General Partner of the Minnesota Wild.

Filming locations
 Connecticut
 Illinois
 Minnesota
 Massachusetts
 New Jersey
 New York
 Nova Scotia

References

External links
 
 Pond Hockey interview with director Tommy Haines at Minnesota Public Radio
 Pond Hockey 81% like it at Rotten Tomatoes
 Pond Hockey Movie Official Website
 Star Tribune Review
 Rhode Island International Film Festival
 Little Village Magazine Review
 Film Critic Review

2008 documentary films
2008 films
American sports documentary films
2008 directorial debut films
Documentary films about ice hockey
American ice hockey films
2000s English-language films
2000s American films